Stefan Stojanović (Serbian Cyrillic: Стефан Стојановић; born 25 April 1992) is a Serbian football forward who plays for Serbian SuperLiga club FK Smederevo.

References

External links
 Profile at Srbijafudbal

1992 births
Living people
Footballers from Belgrade
Serbian footballers
Association football forwards
FK Mladi Radnik players
FK Smederevo players
Serbian SuperLiga players